Glycine/sarcosine/dimethylglycine N-methyltransferase (GSDMT, glycine sarcosine dimethylglycine N-methyltransferase) is an enzyme with systematic name S-adenosyl-L-methionine:glycine(or sarcosine or N,N-dimethylglycine) N-methyltransferase (sarcosine(or N,N-dimethylglycine or betaine)-forming). This enzyme catalyses the following chemical reaction

 3 S-adenosyl-L-methionine + glycine  3 S-adenosyl-L-homocysteine + betaine (overall reaction)
(1a) S-adenosyl-L-methionine + glycine  S-adenosyl-L-homocysteine + sarcosine
(1b) S-adenosyl-L-methionine + sarcosine  S-adenosyl-L-homocysteine + N,N-dimethylglycine
(1c) S-adenosyl-L-methionine + N,N-dimethylglycine  S-adenosyl-L-homocysteine + betaine

This enzyme from the halophilic methanoarchaeon Methanohalophilus portucalensis can methylate glycine and all of its intermediates to form the compatible solute trimethylglycine.

References

External links 
 

EC 2.1.1